Anixia minuta is a species of fungus belonging to the Anixia genus. It was documented in 1872 by Hungarian-Croatian mycologist Stephan Schulzer von Müggenburg.

References 

Agaricomycetes
Fungi described in 1872